The 1947 FA Cup final was the 66th final of the FA Cup. It took place on 26 April 1947 at Wembley Stadium and was contested between Charlton Athletic and Burnley. Charlton were appearing in their second consecutive final after losing to Derby County the previous year, while Second Division Burnley were appearing in their first final since 1914.

Charlton won the match 1–0 after extra time, with Chris Duffy scoring the winning goal. For the second consecutive year, the ball burst during the match; both incidents were later put down to the poor quality of leather available after World War II.

Route to the final

Charlton
Third round: 4–1 v Rochdale (home)
Fourth round: 2–1 v West Brom (away)
Fifth round: 1–0 v Blackburn (home)
Quarter-finals: 2–1 v Preston (home)
Semi-finals: 4–0 v Newcastle (neutral)

Burnley
Third round: 5–1 v Aston Villa (home)
Fourth round: 2–0 v Coventry (home)
Fifth round: 3–0 v Luton (home)
Quarter-finals: 1–1 v Middlesbrough (away) – Replay 1–0 (home)
Semi-finals: 0–0 v Liverpool (neutral) – Replay 1–0 (neutral)

Match details

External links
Match report
Team list  at Soccerbase
FA Cup Final kits 1946–49

FA Cup Finals
FA Cup Final
FA Cup Final 1947
FA Cup Final 1947
FA Cup Final 1947
FA Cup Final